In 1966, the Philadelphia Phillies had a winning record of 87–75. Over the course of the campaign, they held winning records against two of their biggest regional rivals, the Pittsburgh Pirates (10–8) and New York Mets (11–7), respectively. Philadelphia had the fourth-highest winning percentage in the National League (NL) that year. The Phillies were owned by R. R. M. "Bob" Carpenter, Jr., with the Phillies playing home games in Connie Mack Stadium, as they had since 1938.

In the off-season, the Phillies purchased, sold, and traded several players. Among those purchased by other teams was Mike Marshall, sold to the Detroit Tigers on April 11, 1966. Throughout its history, players could be added to the team in several ways, including advancement to the parent club through the farm system. The primary farm teams were the Triple-A San Diego Padres and Double-A Macon Peaches. Phillies farm system players who made their MLB debut with the 1966 squad are pitchers John Morris and Joe Verbanic, and infielder Gary Sutherland.

Regular season

Season standings

Record vs. Opponents

Notable Transactions
 October 27, 1965: Pat Corrales, Art Mahaffey, and Alex Johnson were traded by the Phillies to the St. Louis Cardinals for Dick Groat, Bob Uecker, and Bill White.
 November 29, 1965: Rubén Amaro was traded by the Phillies to the New York Yankees for Phil Linz.
 November 29, 1965: Rich Barry was drafted by the Phillies from the New York Yankees in the 1965 minor league draft.
 December 6, 1965: Jack Baldschun was traded by the Phillies to the Baltimore Orioles for Darold Knowles and Jackie Brandt.
 January 10, 1966: Wes Covington was traded by the Phillies to the Chicago Cubs for Doug Clemens.
 January 29, 1966: Lowell Palmer was drafted by the Phillies in the 1st round (6th pick) of the secondary phase of the 1966 Major League Baseball draft. Player signed February 1, 1966.
 April 11, 1966: Mike Marshall was purchased from the Phillies by the Detroit Tigers.
 April 21, 1966: Ferguson Jenkins, John Herrnstein, and Adolfo Phillips were traded by the Phillies to the Chicago Cubs for Larry Jackson and Bob Buhl.
 June 22, 1966: Norm Gigon was traded by the Phillies to the Chicago Cubs for Billy Cowan.

Game log

|- style="background:#bbb"
| – || April 12 || @ Cardinals || colspan=6 | Postponed (rain); Makeup: June 19 as a traditional double-header
|- style="background:#bfb"
| 1 || April 13 || @ Cardinals || 3–2 (12) || Roger Craig (1–0) || Dennis Aust (0–1) || Ray Culp (1) || 8,219 || 1–0
|- style="background:#bfb"
| 2 || April 14 || @ Cardinals || 5–4 || Darold Knowles (1–0) || Larry Jaster (0–1) || None || 7,223 || 2–0
|- style="background:#bfb"
| 3 || April 15 || Reds || 4–3 || Roger Craig (2–0) || Jack Baldschun (0–1) || None || 29,007 || 3–0
|- style="background:#fbb"
| 4 || April 16 || Reds || 0–4 || Jim Maloney (1–0) || Ray Culp (0–1) || None || 6,298 || 3–1
|- style="background:#bfb"
| 5 || April 17 || Reds || 3–1 || Chris Short (1–0) || Joe Nuxhall (0–1) || None || 13,852 || 4–1
|- style="background:#bbb"
| – || April 18 || Braves || colspan=6 | Postponed (rain); Makeup: June 13 as a traditional double-header
|- style="background:#fbb"
| 6 || April 19 || Braves || 1–3 || Clay Carroll (1–0) || Jim Bunning (0–1) || None || 7,476 || 4–2
|- style="background:#fbb"
| 7 || April 20 || Braves || 1–8 || Ken Johnson (1–1) || Ray Culp (0–2) || None || 6,855 || 4–3
|- style="background:#fbb"
| 8 || April 21 || Braves || 4–5 || Phil Niekro (1–0) || Chris Short (1–1) || None || 5,744 || 4–4
|- style="background:#bfb"
| 9 || April 22 || @ Reds || 9–7 || Darold Knowles (2–0) || Don Nottebart (0–1) || Bob Buhl (1) || 10,266 || 5–4
|- style="background:#bbb"
| – || April 23 || @ Reds || colspan=6 | Postponed (wet grounds and rain); Makeup: June 15 as a traditional double-header
|- style="background:#fbb"
| 10 || April 24 (1) || @ Reds || 2–3 (6) || Sammy Ellis (1–1) || Ray Culp (0–3) || None || 7,248 || 5–5
|- style="background:#bbb"
| – || April 24 (2) || @ Reds || colspan=6 | Postponed (rain); Makeup: August 27 as a traditional double-header
|- style="background:#bfb"
| 11 || April 25 || @ Pirates || 5–0 || Jim Bunning (1–1) || Bob Veale (1–1) || None || 9,564 || 6–5
|- style="background:#bbb"
| – || April 27 || Mets || colspan=6 | Postponed (rain); Makeup: July 7
|- style="background:#bfb"
| 12 || April 29 || @ Cubs || 5–1 || Jim Bunning (2–1) || Dick Ellsworth (0–2) || None || 4,053 || 7–5
|- style="background:#bfb"
| 13 || April 30 || @ Cubs || 12–0 || Chris Short (2–1) || Ken Holtzman (1–1) || None || 4,495 || 8–5
|-

|- style="background:#fbb"
| 14 || May 1 || @ Cubs || 1–6 || Bill Faul (1–0) || Larry Jackson (0–3) || None || 7,783 || 8–6
|- style="background:#fbb"
| 15 || May 3 || @ Braves || 8–9 (10) || Phil Niekro (2–1) || Ray Herbert (0–1) || None || 10,485 || 8–7
|- style="background:#bfb"
| 16 || May 4 || @ Braves || 2–1 || Chris Short (3–1) || Ken Johnson (2–2) || None || 11,588 || 9–7
|- style="background:#fbb"
| 17 || May 5 || @ Braves || 3–4 || Chi-Chi Olivo (1–0) || Gary Wagner (0–1) || Billy O'Dell (4) || 11,236 || 9–8
|- style="background:#bfb"
| 18 || May 6 || Pirates || 8–7 (11) || Darold Knowles (3–0) || Roy Face (3–1) || None || 18,982 || 10–8
|- style="background:#bfb"
| 19 || May 7 || Pirates || 7–3 || Jim Bunning (3–1) || Tommie Sisk (1–1) || None || 7,006 || 11–8
|- style="background:#fbb"
| 20 || May 8 || Pirates || 2–3 || Bob Veale (3–1) || Ray Herbert (0–2) || None || 8,411 || 11–9
|- style="background:#bbb"
| – || May 9 || Dodgers || colspan=6 | Postponed (cold weather); Makeup: July 17 as a traditional double-header
|- style="background:#fbb"
| 21 || May 10 || Dodgers || 1–6 || Sandy Koufax (4–1) || Chris Short (3–2) || None || 14,895 || 11–10
|- style="background:#fbb"
| 22 || May 11 || Dodgers || 0–5 || Don Sutton (4–3) || Larry Jackson (0–4) || None || 11,756 || 11–11
|- style="background:#bfb"
| 23 || May 12 || Dodgers || 5–1 || Jim Bunning (4–1) || Don Drysdale (2–4) || Darold Knowles (1) || 10,205 || 12–11
|- style="background:#fbb"
| 24 || May 13 || Astros || 0–1 || Turk Farrell (1–1) || Chris Short (3–3) || Claude Raymond (3) || 10,559 || 12–12
|- style="background:#fbb"
| 25 || May 14 || Astros || 5–6 (11) || Don Lee (1–0) || Terry Fox (0–2) || Claude Raymond (4) || 3,957 || 12–13
|- style="background:#bfb"
| 26 || May 15 || Astros || 5–2 || Larry Jackson (1–4) || Barry Latman (2–3) || Jim Bunning (1) || 9,208 || 13–13
|- style="background:#bfb"
| 27 || May 17 || Cardinals || 5–3 || Chris Short (4–3) || Nelson Briles (0–2) || None || 8,731 || 14–13
|- style="background:#bfb"
| 28 || May 18 || Cardinals || 4–3 || Ray Culp (1–3) || Bob Gibson (3–5) || None || 11,169 || 15–13
|- style="background:#fbb"
| 29 || May 19 || Cardinals || 0–2 || Al Jackson (3–1) || Larry Jackson (1–5) || Joe Hoerner (1) || 8,972 || 15–14
|- style="background:#bfb"
| 30 || May 20 || @ Astros || 6–5 (10) || Darold Knowles (4–0) || Jim Owens (3–2) || None || 29,763 || 16–14
|- style="background:#fbb"
| 31 || May 21 || @ Astros || 3–4 (11) || Don Lee (2–0) || Bob Buhl (0–1) || None || 30,229 || 16–15
|- style="background:#bfb"
| 32 || May 22 || @ Astros || 6–1 || Jim Bunning (5–1) || Barry Latman (2–4) || None || 20,991 || 17–15
|- style="background:#bfb"
| 33 || May 23 || @ Astros || 9–0 || Larry Jackson (2–5) || Dave Giusti (4–3) || None || 12,384 || 18–15
|- style="background:#fbb"
| 34 || May 24 || @ Dodgers || 2–3 || Don Sutton (6–4) || Bob Buhl (0–2) || Ron Perranoski (3) || 20,286 || 18–16
|- style="background:#fbb"
| 35 || May 25 || @ Dodgers || 1–2 || Don Drysdale (3–4) || Chris Short (4–4) || None || 19,572 || 18–17
|- style="background:#fbb"
| 36 || May 26 || @ Giants || 0–1 (14) || Juan Marichal (9–0) || Darold Knowles (4–1) || None || 7,529 || 18–18
|- style="background:#bfb"
| 37 || May 27 || @ Giants || 9–2 || Larry Jackson (3–5) || Ray Sadecki (2–3) || None || 16,063 || 19–18
|- style="background:#bfb"
| 38 || May 28 || @ Giants || 2–0 || Ray Culp (2–3) || Joe Gibbon (2–2) || Darold Knowles (2) || 17,331 || 20–18
|- style="background:#fbb"
| 39 || May 29 || @ Giants || 5–6 (10) || Lindy McDaniel (3–2) || Bo Belinsky (0–1) || None || 25,237 || 20–19
|- style="background:#bfb"
| 40 || May 30 (1) || @ Mets || 7–2 || Jim Bunning (6–1) || Gordie Richardson (0–2) || None || see 2nd game || 21–19
|- style="background:#fbb"
| 41 || May 30 (2) || @ Mets || 1–3 || Jack Fisher (2–5) || Bob Buhl (0–3) || None || 46,882 || 21–20
|- style="background:#bfb"
| 42 || May 31 || @ Mets || 6–4 || Ray Herbert (1–2) || Larry Bearnarth (1–2) || Darold Knowles (3) || 9,946 || 22–20
|-

|- style="background:#bfb"
| 43 || June 1 (1) || Cubs || 4–3 || Terry Fox (1–2) || Chuck Estrada (1–1) || Darold Knowles (4) || see 2nd game || 23–20
|- style="background:#bfb"
| 44 || June 1 (2) || Cubs || 7–4 || Bob Buhl (1–3) || Bob Hendley (1–2) || None || 12,330 || 24–20
|- style="background:#bfb"
| 45 || June 2 || Cubs || 5–4 || Darold Knowles (5–1) || Ferguson Jenkins (1–1) || None || 6,010 || 25–20
|- style="background:#bfb"
| 46 || June 3 || Giants || 6–1 || Jim Bunning (7–1) || Ray Sadecki (3–4) || None || 27,759 || 26–20
|- style="background:#bfb"
| 47 || June 4 || Giants || 6–1 || Chris Short (5–4) || Juan Marichal (10–1) || None || 36,494 || 27–20
|- style="background:#fbb"
| 48 || June 5 || Giants || 6–7 (10) || Frank Linzy (2–2) || Bo Belinsky (0–2) || None || 22,587 || 27–21
|- style="background:#bfb"
| 49 || June 6 || Giants || 6–2 || Rick Wise (1–0) || Bobby Bolin (4–4) || None || 19,200 || 28–21
|- style="background:#bfb"
| 50 || June 7 || Reds || 5–1 || Jim Bunning (8–1) || Milt Pappas (4–4) || None || 12,422 || 29–21
|- style="background:#bfb"
| 51 || June 8 || Reds || 10–6 || Chris Short (6–4) || Sammy Ellis (2–9) || Darold Knowles (5) || 14,637 || 30–21
|- style="background:#fbb"
| 52 || June 9 || Reds || 0–1 || Joey Jay (6–2) || Bob Buhl (1–4) || None || 13,566 || 30–22
|- style="background:#fbb"
| 53 || June 10 || Cardinals || 0–1 || Curt Simmons (1–1) || Rick Wise (1–1) || Joe Hoerner (3) || 17,693 || 30–23
|- style="background:#fbb"
| 54 || June 11 || Cardinals || 0–2 || Bob Gibson (8–6) || Jim Bunning (8–2) || None || 20,895 || 30–24
|- style="background:#bfb"
| 55 || June 12 || Cardinals || 5–3 || Chris Short (7–4) || Nelson Briles (1–4) || None || 13,421 || 31–24
|- style="background:#bfb"
| 56 || June 13 (1) || Braves || 6–2 || Larry Jackson (4–5) || Tony Cloninger (5–7) || None || see 2nd game || 32–24
|- style="background:#bfb"
| 57 || June 13 (2) || Braves || 6–4 || Bob Buhl (2–4) || Wade Blasingame (3–5) || Terry Fox (2) || 21,642 || 33–24
|- style="background:#fbb"
| 58 || June 14 || Braves || 6–11 || Ken Johnson (5–5) || Rick Wise (1–2) || Chi-Chi Olivo (5) || 16,759 || 33–25
|- style="background:#fbb"
| 59 || June 15 (1) || @ Reds || 6–7 || Billy McCool (3–3) || Ed Roebuck (0–1) || None || see 2nd game || 33–26
|- style="background:#fbb"
| 60 || June 15 (2) || @ Reds || 6–9 || Don Nottebart (1–1) || Ed Roebuck (0–2) || None || 9,538 || 33–27
|- style="background:#bfb"
| 61 || June 16 || @ Reds || 12–5 || Chris Short (8–4) || Sammy Ellis (2–11) || None || 6,359 || 34–27
|- style="background:#bfb"
| 62 || June 17 || @ Cardinals || 6–5 || Darold Knowles (6–1) || Don Dennis (2–1) || None || 23,965 || 35–27
|- style="background:#fbb"
| 63 || June 18 || @ Cardinals || 2–3 || Al Jackson (6–5) || Roger Craig (2–1) || None || 36,932 || 35–28
|- style="background:#fbb"
| 64 || June 19 (1) || @ Cardinals || 0–1 || Ray Washburn (4–3) || Jim Bunning (8–3) || None || see 2nd game || 35–29
|- style="background:#fbb"
| 65 || June 19 (2) || @ Cardinals || 1–5 || Bob Gibson (10–6) || Rick Wise (1–3) || None || 44,940 || 35–30
|- style="background:#fbb"
| 66 || June 20 || @ Braves || 5–7 || Tony Cloninger (7–7) || Terry Fox (1–3) || None || 16,790 || 35–31
|- style="background:#fbb"
| 67 || June 21 || @ Braves || 1–4 || Denny Lemaster (5–4) || Larry Jackson (4–6) || None || 11,649 || 35–32
|- style="background:#bfb"
| 68 || June 22 || @ Braves || 7–3 || Bob Buhl (3–4) || Joey Jay (6–3) || None || 12,544 || 36–32
|- style="background:#fbb"
| 69 || June 24 || Pirates || 1–3 || Bob Veale (8–5) || Jim Bunning (8–4) || None || 26,791 || 36–33
|- style="background:#bfb"
| 70 || June 25 || Pirates || 8–7 || Ray Culp (3–3) || Pete Mikkelsen (5–4) || Roger Craig (1) || 23,160 || 37–33
|- style="background:#fbb"
| 71 || June 26 || Pirates || 0–2 || Woodie Fryman (5–3) || Larry Jackson (4–7) || None || 18,734 || 37–34
|- style="background:#bfb"
| 72 || June 28 || @ Mets || 1–0 || Jim Bunning (9–4) || Bob Friend (2–5) || None || 22,693 || 38–34
|- style="background:#bfb"
| 73 || June 29 || @ Mets || 5–2 || Bob Buhl (4–4) || Rob Gardner (2–6) || Darold Knowles (6) || 13,918 || 39–34
|- style="background:#bfb"
| 74 || June 30 || @ Mets || 1–0 || Chris Short (9–4) || Bob Shaw (5–5) || None || 19,895 || 40–34
|-

|- style="background:#bfb"
| 75 || July 1 || Cubs || 7–0 || Larry Jackson (5–7) || Bill Faul (1–3) || None || 10,670 || 41–34
|- style="background:#bfb"
| 76 || July 2 || Cubs || 12–9 || Rick Wise (2–3) || Dick Ellsworth (3–11) || Ray Herbert (1) || 4,251 || 42–34
|- style="background:#bfb"
| 77 || July 3 || Cubs || 6–2 || Bob Buhl (5–4) || Curt Simmons (2–2) || Darold Knowles (7) || 5,058 || 43–34
|- style="background:#fbb"
| 78 || July 4 (1) || Mets || 6–9 || Bob Shaw (6–5) || Chris Short (9–5) || Jack Hamilton (7) || see 2nd game || 43–35
|- style="background:#fbb"
| 79 || July 4 (2) || Mets || 1–8 || Jack Fisher (6–8) || Ray Culp (3–4) || None || 19,208 || 43–36
|- style="background:#bfb"
| 80 || July 5 || Mets || 3–1 || Larry Jackson (6–7) || Bill Hepler (1–1) || None || 8,047 || 44–36
|- style="background:#fbb"
| 81 || July 6 || Mets || 5–7 || Darrell Sutherland (1–0) || Darold Knowles (6–2) || Jack Hamilton (8) || 12,469 || 44–37
|- style="background:#fbb"
| 82 || July 7 || Mets || 6–9 || Gerry Arrigo (2–1) || Ray Herbert (1–3) || None || 7,447 || 44–38
|- style="background:#bfb"
| 83 || July 8 || @ Cubs || 5–4 || Chris Short (10–5) || Ken Holtzman (3–9) || Darold Knowles (8) || 5,166 || 45–38
|- style="background:#bfb"
| 84 || July 9 || @ Cubs || 11–6 || Larry Jackson (7–7) || Bill Hands (5–8) || Darold Knowles (9) || 7,193 || 46–38
|- style="background:#fbb"
| 85 || July 10 || @ Cubs || 2–10 || Dick Ellsworth (4–12) || Jim Bunning (9–5) || None || 13,863 || 46–39
|- style="background:#bbcaff;"
| – || July 12 ||colspan="7" |1966 Major League Baseball All-Star Game at Busch Memorial Stadium in St. Louis
|- style="background:#bfb"
| 86 || July 14 || Giants || 5–0 || Larry Jackson (8–7) || Gaylord Perry (12–2) || None || 24,347 || 47–39
|- style="background:#fbb"
| 87 || July 15 || Giants || 1–8 || Juan Marichal (15–4) || Jim Bunning (9–6) || None || 29,966 || 47–40
|- style="background:#bfb"
| 88 || July 16 || Giants || 6–5 (15) || Terry Fox (2–3) || Joe Gibbon (3–6) || None || 14,484 || 48–40
|- style="background:#bfb"
| 89 || July 17 (1) || Dodgers || 3–0 || Chris Short (11–5) || Joe Moeller (0–2) || None || see 2nd game || 49–40
|- style="background:#fbb"
| 90 || July 17 (2) || Dodgers || 1–3 || Claude Osteen (12–7) || Ray Herbert (1–4) || Phil Regan (11) || 31,832 || 49–41
|- style="background:#bfb"
| 91 || July 18 || Dodgers || 4–0 || Larry Jackson (9–7) || Sandy Koufax (16–5) || None || 34,755 || 50–41
|- style="background:#fbb"
| 92 || July 19 || @ Astros || 2–8 || Turk Farrell (4–6) || Jim Bunning (9–7) || None || 27,648 || 50–42
|- style="background:#bfb"
| 93 || July 20 || @ Astros || 13–9 || Ray Herbert (2–4) || Don Arlich (0–1) || Darold Knowles (10) || 27,266 || 51–42
|- style="background:#fbb"
| 94 || July 21 || @ Astros || 2–3 || Dave Giusti (10–7) || Chris Short (11–6) || Mike Cuellar (2) || 20,002 || 51–43
|- style="background:#fbb"
| 95 || July 22 || @ Giants || 1–4 || Gaylord Perry (14–2) || Larry Jackson (9–8) || None || 23,420 || 51–44
|- style="background:#bfb"
| 96 || July 23 || @ Giants || 8–0 || Jim Bunning (10–7) || Bobby Bolin (5–6) || None || 23,846 || 52–44
|- style="background:#fbb"
| 97 || July 24 || @ Giants || 1–4 || Ron Herbel (4–3) || Bob Buhl (5–5) || Frank Linzy (11) || 30,835 || 52–45
|- style="background:#fbb"
| 98 || July 25 || @ Dodgers || 3–6 || Ron Perranoski (3–4) || Darold Knowles (6–3) || None || 24,184 || 52–46
|- style="background:#fbb"
| 99 || July 26 || @ Dodgers || 2–3 || Ron Perranoski (4–4) || Larry Jackson (9–9) || None || 54,365 || 52–47
|- style="background:#fbb"
| 100 || July 27 || @ Dodgers || 1–2 (12) || Phil Regan (8–1) || Darold Knowles (6–4) || None || 44,937 || 52–48
|- style="background:#fbb"
| 101 || July 29 || @ Pirates || 3–5 || Billy O'Dell (4–3) || Chris Short (11–7) || Roy Face (16) || 25,358 || 52–49
|- style="background:#bfb"
| 102 || July 30 || @ Pirates || 4–1 || Larry Jackson (10–9) || Woodie Fryman (8–6) || None || 15,804 || 53–49
|- style="background:#bfb"
| 103 || July 31 (1) || @ Pirates || 8–1 || Jim Bunning (11–7) || Vern Law (6–5) || None || see 2nd game || 54–49
|- style="background:#bfb"
| 104 || July 31 (2) || @ Pirates || 6–5 (10) || Joe Verbanic (1–0) || Roy Face (4–4) || Ray Herbert (2) || 28,947 || 55–49
|-

|- style="background:#bfb"
| 105 || August 1 || Astros || 6–5 (10) || Terry Fox (3–3) || Jim Owens (4–6) || None || 11,602 || 56–49
|- style="background:#bfb"
| 106 || August 2 || Astros || 4–3 || Rick Wise (3–3) || Barry Latman (2–6) || Terry Fox (3) || 10,949 || 57–49
|- style="background:#bfb"
| 107 || August 3 || Astros || 7–6 || Larry Jackson (11–9) || Carroll Sembera (0–2) || Darold Knowles (11) || 14,918 || 58–49
|- style="background:#bfb"
| 108 || August 4 || Astros || 12–2 || Jim Bunning (12–7) || Dave Giusti (11–9) || None || 15,389 || 59–49
|- style="background:#fbb"
| 109 || August 5 || Braves || 2–9 || Dick Kelley (1–2) || Joe Verbanic (1–1) || Ted Abernathy (8) || 22,520 || 59–50
|- style="background:#bfb"
| 110 || August 6 || Braves || 6–5 || Chris Short (12–7) || Clay Carroll (4–4) || Darold Knowles (12) || 24,330 || 60–50
|- style="background:#fbb"
| 111 || August 7 || Braves || 0–3 || Tony Cloninger (10–7) || Larry Jackson (11–10) || None || 14,582 || 60–51
|- style="background:#fbb"
| 112 || August 9 || @ Cardinals || 2–3 || Larry Jaster (7–3) || Jim Bunning (12–8) || Nelson Briles (5) || 26,191 || 60–52
|- style="background:#bfb"
| 113 || August 10 || @ Cardinals || 5–1 || Chris Short (13–7) || Steve Carlton (1–1) || None || 23,090 || 61–52
|- style="background:#fbb"
| 114 || August 11 || @ Cardinals || 1–5 || Al Jackson (12–9) || Larry Jackson (11–11) || None || 22,404 || 61–53
|- style="background:#bbb"
| – || August 12 || @ Braves || colspan=6 | Postponed (rain); Makeup: August 13 as a traditional double-header
|- style="background:#bfb"
| 115 || August 13 (1) || @ Braves || 4–2 || Jim Bunning (13–8) || Ken Johnson (9–8) || Darold Knowles (13) || see 2nd game || 62–53
|- style="background:#bfb"
| 116 || August 13 (2) || @ Braves || 7–4 || Ray Culp (4–4) || Pat Jarvis (0–1) || Terry Fox (4) || 27,770 || 63–53
|- style="background:#fbb"
| 117 || August 14 || @ Braves || 1–7 || Denny Lemaster (11–8) || Bob Buhl (5–6) || None || 16,855 || 63–54
|- style="background:#bfb"
| 118 || August 15 || Cubs || 11–5 || Chris Short (14–7) || Bill Hands (8–11) || Terry Fox (5) || 7,627 || 64–54
|- style="background:#bfb"
| 119 || August 16 || Cubs || 5–3 || Larry Jackson (12–11) || Ferguson Jenkins (2–6) || None || 11,321 || 65–54
|- style="background:#fbb"
| 120 || August 17 || Cubs || 3–5 (10) || Curt Simmons (4–3) || Bob Buhl (5–7) || None || 9,954 || 65–55
|- style="background:#bfb"
| 121 || August 19 || Mets || 5–4 (10) || John Morris (1–0) || Bob Friend (5–8) || None || 17,462 || 66–55
|- style="background:#bfb"
| 122 || August 20 || Mets || 5–4 (11) || Ray Culp (5–4) || Dick Selma (3–4) || None || 7,643 || 67–55
|- style="background:#fbb"
| 123 || August 21 (1) || Mets || 5–6 || Bill Hepler (3–2) || Rick Wise (3–4) || Jack Hamilton (12) || see 2nd game || 67–56
|- style="background:#fbb"
| 124 || August 21 (2) || Mets || 1–5 || Tug McGraw (2–5) || Jim Bunning (13–9) || None || 36,625 || 67–57
|- style="background:#fbb"
| 125 || August 22 || @ Pirates || 5–6 || Don Cardwell (6–6) || Bob Buhl (5–8) || Pete Mikkelsen (10) || 15,119 || 67–58
|- style="background:#bfb"
| 126 || August 23 || @ Pirates || 5–4 || Chris Short (15–7) || Billy O'Dell (4–4) || None || 25,504 || 68–58
|- style="background:#fbb"
| 127 || August 24 || @ Pirates || 4–6 || Vern Law (9–5) || Larry Jackson (12–12) || None || 19,899 || 68–59
|- style="background:#bfb"
| 128 || August 25 || @ Pirates || 4–1 || Jim Bunning (14–9) || Bob Veale (13–8) || None || 25,658 || 69–59
|- style="background:#fbb"
| 129 || August 26 || @ Reds || 0–2 || Jim O'Toole (5–6) || Rick Wise (3–5) || Billy McCool (15) || 16,203 || 69–60
|- style="background:#fbb"
| 130 || August 27 (1) || @ Reds || 7–14 || Ted Davidson (2–1) || Chris Short (15–8) || None || see 2nd game || 69–61
|- style="background:#fbb"
| 131 || August 27 (2) || @ Reds || 7–8 || Billy McCool (8–8) || Ray Herbert (2–5) || None || 17,966 || 69–62
|- style="background:#fbb"
| 132 || August 28 || @ Reds || 2–5 || Jim Maloney (14–4) || Larry Jackson (12–13) || Don Nottebart (10) || 12,698 || 69–63
|- style="background:#bfb"
| 133 || August 29 || Giants || 5–1 || Jim Bunning (15–9) || Ray Sadecki (4–7) || None || 25,994 || 70–63
|- style="background:#fbb"
| 134 || August 30 || Giants || 1–7 || Bobby Bolin (8–9) || Rick Wise (3–6) || Frank Linzy (16) || 25,086 || 70–64
|- style="background:#bfb"
| 135 || August 31 || Astros || 10–5 || Chris Short (16–8) || Bob Bruce (2–11) || None || 9,420 || 71–64
|-

|- style="background:#bfb"
| 136 || September 1 || Astros || 3–1 || Larry Jackson (13–13) || Turk Farrell (6–9) || None || 8,974 || 72–64
|- style="background:#bfb"
| 137 || September 2 || @ Mets || 6–0 || Jim Bunning (16–9) || Larry Miller (0–1) || None || 24,541 || 73–64
|- style="background:#bfb"
| 138 || September 3 || @ Mets || 8–4 || Rick Wise (4–6) || Bob Shaw (10–12) || None || 19,921 || 74–64
|- style="background:#bfb"
| 139 || September 4 || @ Mets || 5–0 || Chris Short (17–8) || Tug McGraw (2–7) || None || 17,770 || 75–64
|- style="background:#fbb"
| 140 || September 5 (1) || @ Cubs || 4–5 || Arnold Earley (2–1) || Darold Knowles (6–5) || None || see 2nd game || 75–65
|- style="background:#bfb"
| 141 || September 5 (2) || @ Cubs || 7–2 || Ray Culp (6–4) || Dick Ellsworth (5–20) || None || 20,669 || 76–65
|- style="background:#fbb"
| 142 || September 6 || @ Cubs || 2–7 || Ferguson Jenkins (3–7) || Jim Bunning (16–10) || Bob Hendley (6) || 3,218 || 76–66
|- style="background:#bfb"
| 143 || September 9 || Reds || 7–6 || Larry Jackson (14–13) || Milt Pappas (10–11) || None || 14,866 || 77–66
|- style="background:#fbb"
| 144 || September 10 || Reds || 1–2 || Sammy Ellis (12–16) || Jim Bunning (16–11) || Billy McCool (18) || 14,819 || 77–67
|- style="background:#bfb"
| 145 || September 11 || Reds || 9–3 || Chris Short (18–8) || Jim Maloney (14–7) || None || 9,363 || 78–67
|- style="background:#fbb"
| 146 || September 13 || @ Giants || 2–7 || Juan Marichal (22–6) || Larry Jackson (14–14) || None || 11,930 || 78–68
|- style="background:#bfb"
| 147 || September 14 || @ Giants || 2–0 || Jim Bunning (17–11) || Gaylord Perry (20–7) || None || 8,328 || 79–68
|- style="background:#fbb"
| 148 || September 16 || @ Astros || 4–6 || Mike Cuellar (11–9) || Chris Short (18–9) || None || 10,920 || 79–69
|- style="background:#fbb"
| 149 || September 17 || @ Astros || 2–11 || Larry Dierker (9–7) || John Morris (1–1) || None || 10,291 || 79–70
|- style="background:#bfb"
| 150 || September 18 || @ Dodgers || 4–0 || Larry Jackson (15–14) || Claude Osteen (16–12) || None || 36,183 || 80–70
|- style="background:#fbb"
| 151 || September 19 || @ Dodgers || 1–6 || Don Drysdale (11–16) || Jim Bunning (17–12) || None || 24,900 || 80–71
|- style="background:#fbb"
| 152 || September 20 || @ Dodgers || 1–11 || Sandy Koufax (25–8) || Chris Short (18–10) || None || 41,726 || 80–72
|- style="background:#bfb"
| 153 || September 21 || @ Dodgers || 3–2 || Rick Wise (5–6) || Claude Osteen (16–13) || None || 35,770 || 81–72
|- style="background:#bfb"
| 154 || September 23 || Cardinals || 5–4 (12) || Ray Culp (7–4) || Dick Hughes (1–1) || None || 6,896 || 82–72
|- style="background:#bfb"
| 155 || September 24 || Cardinals || 5–4 || Jim Bunning (18–12) || Al Jackson (13–14) || None || 8,186 || 83–72
|- style="background:#bfb"
| 156 || September 25 || Cardinals || 4–3 (13) || Bob Buhl (6–8) || Nelson Briles (4–15) || None || 4,628 || 84–72
|- style="background:#bfb"
| 157 || September 26 || Pirates || 5–4 (11) || Jim Bunning (19–12) || Billy O'Dell (5–5) || None || 8,289 || 85–72
|- style="background:#bbb"
| – || September 27 || Pirates || colspan=6 | Postponed (rain); Makeup: September 28 as a traditional double-header
|- style="background:#fbb"
| 158 || September 28 (1) || Pirates || 1–2 || Steve Blass (11–6) || Jim Bunning (19–13) || Tommie Sisk (1) || see 2nd game || 85–73
|- style="background:#fbb"
| 159 || September 28 (2) || Pirates || 2–4 || Bob Veale (16–12) || Larry Jackson (15–15) || None || 7,213 || 85–74
|- style="background:#bfb"
| 160 || September 30 || Dodgers || 5–3 || Chris Short (19–10) || Claude Osteen (17–14) || None || 16,603 || 86–74
|-

|- style="background:#bbb"
| – || October 1 || Dodgers || colspan=6 | Postponed (rain); Makeup: October 2 as a traditional double-header
|- style="background:#bfb"
| 161 || October 2 (1) || Dodgers || 4–3 || Chris Short (20–10) || Bob Miller (4–2) || None || see 2nd game || 87–74
|- style="background:#fbb"
| 162 || October 2 (2) || Dodgers || 3–6 || Sandy Koufax (27–9) || Jim Bunning' (19–14) || None || 23,215 || 87–75
|-

 Roster 

 Player stats 
 Batting 
 Starters by position Note: Pos = Position; G = Games played; AB = At bats; H = Hits; Avg. = Batting average; HR = Home runs; RBI = Runs batted in Other batters Note: G = Games played; AB = At bats; H = Hits; Avg. = Batting average; HR = Home runs; RBI = Runs batted in Pitching 
 Starting pitchers Note: G = Games pitched; IP = Innings pitched; W = Wins; L = Losses; ERA = Earned run average; SO = Strikeouts Other pitchers Note: G = Games pitched; IP = Innings pitched; W = Wins; L = Losses; ERA = Earned run average; SO = Strikeouts Relief pitchers Note: G = Games pitched; W = Wins; L = Losses; SV = Saves; ERA = Earned run average; SO = Strikeouts''

Farm system 

LEAGUE CHAMPIONS: Spartanburg

Eugene affiliation shared with St. Louis Cardinals

References

External links
1966 Philadelphia Phillies Statistics at Baseball-Reference.com

Philadelphia Phillies seasons
Philadelphia Phillies season
Philadelph